Bojana Laura Ordinačev (born August 14, 1980, in Novi Sad, Serbia, SFR Yugoslavia) is a Serbian model and actress who made her debut in 2003 television series M(j)ešoviti brak. She also portrayed in Serbian telenovelas like Jelena (2004) and Ne daj se, Nina (2007), Serbo-Croatian version of Ugly Betty. She lives and works in Belgrade.

Filmography

Television
M(j)ešoviti brak (2003) as Sandra
Jelena (2004) as Helen Despotović Milijaš
Caravaggio (2007) as Anna Bianchini
Ne daj se, Nina (2007–present) as Patricija Vučković
Zakon ljubavi (2008–present) as Iris  
Istine i laži (2017-present) as Kristina Kris Bajčetić

External links 

21st-century Serbian actresses
1980 births
Living people
Actors from Novi Sad
Serbian television actresses
Telenovela actresses
Serbian female models
Models from Novi Sad